Jacinto is a Spanish and Portuguese name meaning Hyacinth, which can refer to Saint Hyacinth, a Roman martyr (Hyacinth and Protus), or the Hyacinth flower itself.

Common English nicknames for "Jacinto" are "Chinto" and "Jesse".  Jacinto has only a few equivalents in other languages such as the Polish "Jacek" and "Jacenty", the Italian "Giacinto" and the Hungarian "Jácint".

People with the given name include:
 Jacinto Barquín (1915–?), Cuban footballer
 Jacinto Barrasa (died 1704), Peruvian Jesuit preacher and historian
 Jacinto Benavente (1866–1954), Spanish dramatist and Nobel laureate
 Jacinto Caamaño (1759–1829), leader of the last great Spanish exploration of Alaska (then Russian America) and the coast of what is now British Columbia
 Jacinto Canek (c. 1731–1761), Maya revolutionary who fought against the Spanish
 Jacinto Convit (1913–2014), Venezuelan physician and scientist
 Jacinto Diniz (1888–1949), American politician and businessman
 Jacinto Elá (born 1982), Equatoguinean retired footballer
 Jacinto Espinoza (born 1969), Ecuadorian former football goalkeeper
 Jacinto Grau (1877–1958), Spanish playwright and writer
 Jacinto João (1944–2004), Portuguese footballer
 Jacinto Lara (1777–1859), Venezuelan independence leader and military officer of the Venezuelan War of Independence
 Jacinto Molina Álvarez, birth name of Paul Naschy (1934–2009), Spanish film actor, screenwriter and director
 Jacinto Morano (born 1984), Spanish lawyer and politician
 Jacinto Moreno, retired Philippine Constabulary enlisted trooper and recipient of the Medal of Valor, the Philippines' highest military award for courage 
 Jacinto Peynado (1878–1940), president of the Dominican Republic from 1938 to 1940
 Jacinto Quincoces (1905–1997), Spanish football player and manager
 Jacinto Rodríguez (footballer) (born 1958), Paraguayan former footballer
 Jacinto Rodríguez Díaz (1901–1929), aviation pioneer in Guatemala
 Jacinto Rodriguez (1815–1880), recipient of the Rancho Jacinto Mexican land grant
 Jacinto Santos (born 1941), Portuguese former footballer
 Jacinto Vera (1813–1881), Uruguayan Roman Catholic prelate and first bishop of Montevideo
 Jacinto Zamora (1835–1872), Filipino Catholic priest, one of a trio of priests falsely accused of mutiny

References

See also
Hyacinth
San Jacinto
Jacek
Jack
Spanish masculine given names
Portuguese masculine given names